Live in Aspen is from Australian rock band INXS.  Recorded live at the Wheeler Opera House in Aspen Colorado USA, it is now considered to be a rare 1997 Australian limited edition 6-track CD. It was released exclusively through Brashs Record Store following the release of the album Elegantly Wasted, and is the final release before the death of lead singer Michael Hutchence in November that same year.

Track listing 
 "New Sensation"
 "Elegantly Wasted"
 "Searching"
 "Need You Tonight"
 "What You Need"
 "Kick"

Videos & Photos (external) 
 Need You Tonight
 INXS Rock the Rockies pictures

References 

Eli Community 
www.imeem.com 
YouTube 
Aspen Valley Film website 

Live EPs
INXS live albums
1997 EPs
INXS EPs
1997 live albums
Mercury Records live albums
Mercury Records EPs